Ekaterina Ivanova and Andreja Klepač were the defending champions, but neither chose to participate.

In an all-Ukrainian final, the number two seeds, Valentyna Ivakhnenko and Kateryna Kozlova, defeated the top seeds, Lyudmyla Kichenok and Nadiya Kichenok to take the title, 6–4, 6–7(6–8), [10–4].

Seeds

Draw

Draw

References
 Main Draw

Tatarstan Open - Doubles
Tatarstan Open
2012 in Russian tennis